The following is an incomplete list of massacres that have occurred in Myanmar (formerly known as Burma).

References 

Myanmar
Massacres

Massacres